VK Selver Tallinn is a professional Volleyball team based in Tallinn, Estonia. It plays in the Baltic Men Volleyball League and in the CEV Challenge Cup.

History
Audentes Volleyball Club was founded in 2000. In 2005–06 season an Estonian supermarket chain Selver became the name sponsor for the team. Under the coaching of the Estonian national team head coach Avo Keel Selver won both the Estonian League and the Baltic Men Volleyball League five years in a row.

2000–04 Audentes/Hermann
2004–05 Audentes Tallinn
2005–06 Selver/Audentes University
2006–07 Selver/Tallinn
2007– VK Selver Tallinn

Team roster

2021/2022

Season by season

Honours
Baltic League
 Winners (7): 2007, 2008, 2009, 2010, 2011, 2014, 2021
 Runners-up: 2012, 2015
Estonian League
 Winners (9): 2005, 2007, 2008, 2009, 2010, 2011, 2013, 2016, 2017
 Runners-up: 2006, 2012, 2014
Estonian Cup
 Winners (7): 2004, 2006, 2007, 2009, 2010, 2011, 2020
 Runners-up: 2008, 2012, 2016, 2021

Head coaches
2000–2001  Andres Skuin
2004–2005  Juha Lantto
2005–2014  Avo Keel
2014–2017  Rainer Vassiljev
2017–2018  Austris Štāls
2018–2019  Aapo Rantanen
2019–2020   Alessandro Piroli
2020–2021  Rainer Vassiljev
2021–  Andres Toobal

Notable players

  Andri Aganits (2 seasons: 2011–2013)
  Martti Juhkami (1 season: 2012–2013)
  Ardo Kreek (3 seasons: 2006–2009)
  Meelis Kivisild (7 seasons: 2008–2015)
  Kristo Kollo (1 season: 2020–2021)
  Federico Marretta (1 season: 2014–2015)
  Argo Meresaar (5 seasons: 2008–2013)
  Oliver Orav
  Raimo Pajusalu (1 season: 2004–2005)
  Dmytro Pashytskyy (1 season: 2010–2011)
  Deniss Petrovs (2 seasons: 2009–2011)
  Hindrek Pulk (4 seasons: 2010–2014)
  Keith Pupart (5 seasons: 2004–2009)
  Andrus Raadik (1 season: 2020–2021)
  Martti Rosenblatt (9 seasons: 2006–2012; 2013–2016)
  Janis Sirelpuu (3 seasons: 2004–2005; 2007–2009)
  Rauno Tamme (1 season: 2016–2017)
  Timo Tammemaa (5 seasons: 2009–2014)
  Renee Teppan (1 season: 2020–2021)
  Andres Toobal (3 seasons: 2014–2016; 2018–2019)
  Rivo Vesik (2 seasons: 2004–2006)
  Lincoln Williams (3 seasons: 2014–2017)

References

External links
 Official site

Estonian volleyball clubs
Sport in Tallinn